Linnell is an English surname. People bearing this name include:
 Albert Paul Linnell (1922–2017), American astronomer AAS obituary
Allison Linnell (b. 1990), American racing cyclist
Derek Linnell (b. 1968), Canadian ice hockey player
Francis John Linnell (1892–1944), RAF commander
James Linnell, American writer and academic
Jim Linnell, American leather craftsman
John Linnell, multiple people including:
John Linnell (cabinet maker) (1729–1796), English cabinet-maker
John Linnell (painter) (1792–1882), English landscape painter
John Wycliffe Linnell (1878–1967), British physician
John Linnell (b. 1959), American rock musician who co-founded the band They Might Be Giants
Stuart Linnell, British broadcaster

English-language surnames